DOTE, Dote or Doté may refer to:

Dancing on the Edge Festival, a biannual performing arts festival in the Netherlands
Department of Technical Education, a body of the government of Kerala, India
Director, Operational Test and Evaluation, a staff assistant and adviser to the US Secretary of Defense
Distributed Open Transcription Environment, a transcription software

People with the surname
Élie Doté (born 1948), former prime minister of the Central African Republic
Franck Doté (born 1975), Togolese former footballer
Tomohide Dote (born 1944), Japanese Nihonga painter